1929–1933 is a 1990 compilation album collecting material recorded by Henry "Red" Allen and his orchestra during the years 1929 to 1933. The first of five CDs released by Chronological Classics, the album is rated part of the "core collection" by the Penguin Guide to Jazz. Allen and Coleman Hawkins shared leadership of the band.

Critical reception

The album has been critically well received. Scott Yanow, writing for AllMusic, described it as "one of the best" of the series, with "many memorable sections." The authors of The Penguin Guide to Jazz list the album as part of their "core collection".

Track listing
All songs composed by Red Allen, except as otherwise noted.
"It Should Be You"  – 3:10
"Biff'ly Blues"  – 3:26
"Feeling Drowsy"  – 3:36
"Swing Out" (Allen, J. C. Higginbotham)  – 3:17
"Make a Country Bird Fly Wild" (Allen, Paul Barbarin)  – 3:26
"Funny Feathers" (Victoria Spivey)  – 2:58
"How Do They Do It That Way?" (Spivey)  – 3:19
"Pleasin' Paul" (Allen, Barbarin)  – 2:54
"Sugar Hill Function" (Charlie Holmes)  – 3:03
"You Might Get Better, but You'll Never Get Well" (Louis Metcalf, Luis Russell)  – 3:07
"Everybody Shout" (Barbarin, Russell)  – 2:27
"Dancing Dave" (Allen, Barbarin)  – 3:11
"Roamin' Smith"  – 3:39
"Singing Pretty Songs" (Allen, Barbarin, Russell)  – 3:19
"Patrol Wagon Blues" (Porter Grainger)  – 3:22
"I Fell in Love with You"  – 3:30
"Someday, Sweetheart" (Benjamin Franklin Spikes, John Spikes)  – 2:57
"I Wish I Could Shimmy Like My Sister Kate" (Armand Piron)  – 2:44
"The River's Takin' Care of Me" (Stanley Adams, Jesse Greer)  – 2:40
"Ain'tcha Got Music?" (James P. Johnson, Andy Razaf)  – 2:48
"Stringin' Along on a Shoe String" (Harold Adamson, Burton Lane)  – 2:47
"Shadows on the Swanee" (Johnny Burke, Harold Spina, Joe Young)  – 2:44
"Hush My Mouth (If I Ain't Goin' South)" (Michael Cleary, Al Hoffman, Maurice Sigler)  – 3:01

Personnel
Bernard Addison – banjo, guitar
Henry "Red" Allen – trumpet, vocals
Henry Allen & His New York Orchestra
Jimmy Archey – trombone
Paul Barbarin – drums, vibraphone
William Thornton Blue – clarinet, alto saxophone
Oliver Childs – bass, bass vocal
Pops Foster – bass, string bass
Four Wanderers – vocals
Coleman Hawkins – tenor saxophone
Horace Henderson – piano
J. C. Higginbotham – trombone
Ernest "Bass" Hill – brass bass
Teddy Hill – baritone vocals, clarinet, tenor saxophone, baritone saxophone
Charlie Holmes – clarinet, alto saxophone, soprano saxophone
Herman Hughes – tenor saxophone, tenor vocals
Edward Inge – clarinet, alto saxophone
Hilton Jefferson – alto saxophone
Maceo Johnson – baritone vocal, baritone saxophone, vocals
Manzie Johnson – drums
Otis Johnson – trumpet
Walter Johnson – drums
Will Johnson – banjo, guitar, vocals
John Kirby – brass bass, baritone saxophone, string bass
Don Kirkpatrick – piano
Benny Morton – trombone
Albert Nicholas – clarinet, alto saxophone
Russell Procope – clarinet, alto saxophone
Luis Russell – piano, celeste
Anatol Schenker – liner notes
Victoria Spivey – vocals
Greely Walton – tenor saxophone
Dicky Wells – trombone
Bob Ysaguirre – brass bass, baritone saxophone, string bass, tuba

References

Red Allen compilation albums
1990 albums
1929 in music
1930s in music
Chronological Classics compilation albums